Undan Island Lighthouse is a lighthouse on the summit of the uninhabited islet of Undan Island, located  off the coast of mainland Malacca in Malaysia.

The lighthouse was engineered and constructed by the Chance Brothers and Company from Birmingham in 1879 and completed in 1880, as a beacon for ships travelling along the Strait of Malacca. It is octagonal and cylindrical in shape, housing the lantern and a gallery and is adjoined to a single storey keeper's house; both structures were constructed of masonry.

A more recent concrete communications tower, roughly three times the height of the original lighthouse, is cylindrical and stark in design, and situated directly beside the lighthouse.

See also 

 List of lighthouses in Malaysia
 Cape Rachado Lighthouse

References 

Buildings and structures in Malacca
Lighthouses completed in 1880
Lighthouses in Malaysia